Lugo is a Spanish surname named after the city of Lugo in Galicia, Spain.

People with the surname de Lugo
These are patrilineal descendants of the original House of Lugo, a noble family in Lugo.
 Álvaro Yáñez de Lugo, Spanish nobleman
 Francisco de Lugo (conquistador) (d. 1532), Spanish conquistador, son of Álvaro
 Alonso Fernández de Lugo (d. 1525), Spanish conquistador, great-nephew of Álvaro
 Pedro Fernández de Lugo (1475–1536), Spanish nobleman, son of Alonso
 Francisco Bahamonde de Lugo (d. 1574), Governor of Puerto Rico and Cartagena
 Francisco de Lugo (1580–1652) Spanish Jesuit, theologician
 John de Lugo (1583–1660), Spanish Jesuit, cardinal, brother of Francisco
 Bernardo de Lugo, Spanish linguist, friar and writer from Nueva Granada
 Carlos Benites Franquis de Lugo (b. 1691), Spanish Governor of Texas
 Ron de Lugo (1930–2020), American politician

People with the surname Lugo
The shortened form Lugo is likely a branch of the original de Lugo lineage, as in similar cases (e.g. Peña and de la Peña).
Alfonso Lugo (born 1978), Mexican singer, musician, broadcaster and record producer
Amador Lugo Guadarrama (1921–2002), Mexican artist
Cecilia Lugo (born 1955), Mexican dancer and choreographer
Fernando Lugo (born 1951), former president of Paraguay
José del Carmen Lugo (1831–c.1870), Southern California landowner
José Inocente Lugo (1871–1963), Mexican lawyer
Julio Lugo (1975–2021), Dominican baseball shortstop, brother of Ruddy
Matthew Lugo (born 2001), Puerto Rican baseball player
Pablo Lugo (born 1932), Puerto Rican boxer
Richard Lugo (born 1973), Venezuelan basketball player 
Roberto Lugo (born 1981), American potter and social activist
Ruddy Lugo (born 1980), Dominican baseball pitcher, brother of Julio
Seth Lugo (born 1989), American baseball player

Spanish-language surnames
Galician-language surnames
Spanish toponymic surnames